KDDM (100.5 FM) is a terrestrial American radio station, currently airing an unknown format. Licensed to Mount Vernon, Texas, United States, the station is owned by the North Texas Radio Group, L.P.

History
Brazos TV, Inc. was granted a construction permit for a Class A radio station, licensed to Annona, Texas on March 31, 2017.

As a part of the sale of KETE Sulphur Bluff, Texas, Brazos TV, Inc. included the construction permit for the inbuilt KEUT Annona to North Texas Radio Group, L.P. The sale of the facility was consummated on December 30, 2019.

North Texas Radio Group, L.P. then applied to move the construction permit further south to serve the Mount Pleasant, Texas area, which was granted by the Federal Communications Commission on March 19, 2020, and included a change of city of license to Mount Vernon. The station received a License to Cover and signed on the air April 2, 2020.

References

External links

DDM